Yangshao is a town of Mianchi County, Sanmenxia, Henan, China. Before 2011, it was known as Yangshao township.

It is known for the first archeological site of the Yangshao culture and for Yangshaojiu Baijiu.

References 

Archaeological sites in China
Township-level divisions of Henan
Mianchi County
Yangshao culture